The Mytilini Strait is a strait in the Aegean Sea that separates the Greek island of Lesbos from Turkey.

Straits of Greece
Straits of Turkey
International straits
Greece–Turkey border
Landforms of Lesbos
Landforms of the North Aegean